Ricardo Ian Peter Loubscher, born 11 June 1974 in Colesberg (South Africa), is former a South African rugby union player, who played for South Africa 4 times between 2002 and 2003, his last coming during the 2003 Rugby World Cup. He played for the Sharks in Super Rugby, typically as a Fullback. He has played provincial rugby in the Currie Cup for Natal Sharks and Mighty Elephants.

He played his first test match for the Springboks on the 8 June 2002 during a match against Wales.

Since 2012, he has been the backs coach for the National team, under head coach Heyneke Meyer.

References

External links
2003 Springboks site, Georgia
Statistics from scrum.com

1974 births
Living people
People from Colesberg
South African rugby union players
South Africa international rugby union players
Bulls (rugby union) players
Blue Bulls players
Sharks (rugby union) players
Sharks (Currie Cup) players
South Africa international rugby sevens players
Male rugby sevens players
Rugby union fullbacks